Asparagaceae, known as the asparagus family, is a family of flowering plants, placed in the order Asparagales of the monocots. The family name is based on the edible garden asparagus, Asparagus officinalis.  Those who live in the temperate climates may be surprised to learn that this family includes both common garden plants as well as common houseplants.  The garden plants include asparagus, yucca, bluebell, and hosta,  and the houseplants include snake plant, corn cane, spider plant and plumosus fern.

Taxonomy
In earlier classification systems, the species involved were often treated as belonging to the family Liliaceae. The APG II system of 2003 allowed two options as to the circumscription of the family: either Asparagaceae sensu lato ("in the wider sense") combining seven previously recognized families, or Asparagaceae sensu stricto ("in the strict sense") consisting of very few genera (notably Asparagus, also Hemiphylacus), but nevertheless totalling a few hundred species. The revised APG III system of 2009 allows only the broader sense. A paper published at the same time proposed seven subfamilies to correspond to the originally separate families. These are:
 subfamily Agavoideae = family Agavaceae and family Hesperocallidaceae (the agaves, yuccas, joshua trees)
 subfamily Aphyllanthoideae = family Aphyllanthaceae
 subfamily Asparagoideae = family Asparagaceae sensu stricto
 subfamily Brodiaeoideae = family Themidaceae
 subfamily Lomandroideae = family Laxmanniaceae
 subfamily Nolinoideae = family Ruscaceae
 subfamily Scilloideae = family Hyacinthaceae (hyacinths, bluebells, and squills)

Genera
Asparagaceae includes 114 genera with a total of approximately 2,900 known species. Unless otherwise noted, the alphabetical list below is based on genera accepted by the World Checklist of Selected Plant Families as in the family Asparagaceae (with synonyms from the same source). The reference against the subfamily name is to the source which places the genus in that subfamily.

References

Bibliography

External links
 
 Asparagaceae [sensu stricto] in L. Watson and M.J. Dallwitz (1992 onwards). The families of flowering plants: descriptions, illustrations, identification, information retrieval. Version: 27 April 2006. https://web.archive.org/web/20070103200438/http://delta-intkey.com/
 Liliaceae in Flora of North America
 NCBI Taxonomy Browser [Asparagaceae sensu stricto]
 links at CSDL, Texas
 Asparagaceae in BoDD – Botanical Dermatology Database

 
Asparagales families